Gonomyopsis is a genus of crane flies in the family Limoniidae. It was originally described as a subgenus of Gonomyodes.

Distribution
California, United States.

Species
G. doaneana Alexander, 1966

References

Limoniidae
Diptera of North America
Endemic fauna of California
Tipulomorpha genera